"Say It Again" is a song written by Bob McDill, and recorded by American country music artist Don Williams.  It was released in April 1976 as the second single from the album Harmony.  The song was Williams' fifth number one on the country chart.  The single stayed at number one for one week and spent 12 weeks on the country chart.

Charts

Weekly charts

Year-end charts

References
 

1976 singles
1976 songs
Don Williams songs
Songs written by Bob McDill
ABC Records singles
Dot Records singles